Jedlec  is a village in the administrative district of Gmina Gołuchów, within Pleszew County, Greater Poland Voivodeship, in west-central Poland.

The village has a population of 720.

References

Jedlec